Jimmy Carroll (born 26 July 1957 in Hospital, County Limerick) is a retired Irish sportsperson.  He played hurling with his local club Hospital-Herbertstown and was a member of the Limerick senior inter-county team in the 1970s and 1980s.  Carroll won back-to-back National Hurling League and Munster titles with his native county.

References

1957 births
Living people
Hospital-Herbertstown hurlers
Limerick inter-county hurlers
Munster inter-provincial hurlers